The Class 99.32 engines were standard steam locomotives (Einheitsdampflokomotiven) in service with the Deutsche Reichsbahn in Germany. The three examples built are still working today on the Bäderbahn Molli (Molli Spa Railway) between Bad Doberan and Kühlungsborn-West. A feature of the engines is the tapered driver's cab due to the restricted loading gauge of the upper section of the line. With a top speed of 50 km/h it is one of the fastest narrow gauge locomotive classes in the whole of Germany, however it cannot run at that speed on this particular route.

Together with the DRG Class 99.33s, they are the only steam locomotives on the Bäderbahn Molli. Because the small Wismut engines have a low tractive effort and top speed, the search for alternatives started. As a result,  in 2009 a fourth Einheitslok was built in Dampflokwerk Meiningen.

 99 321 in service at Kühlungsborn West
 99 322 in service at Kühlungsborn West
 99 323 in service at Kühlungsborn West
 99 324 in service at Kühlungsborn West

See also
 List of DRG locomotives and railbuses

References 

 
 
 

99.032
2-8-2T locomotives
99.32
Railway locomotives introduced in 1932
900 mm gauge locomotives
1′D1′ h2t locomotives